Allotriopus is a genus of beetles in the family Carabidae, containing the following species:

 Allotriopus ashei (Ball & Roughley, 1982)
 Allotriopus brachypterus (Chaudoir, 1878)
 Allotriopus hallbergi (Ball & Roughley, 1982)
 Allotriopus hemingi (Ball & Roughley, 1982)
 Allotriopus oscitans (Tschitscherine, 1900)
 Allotriopus serratipes (Chaudoir, 1878)
 Allotriopus shpeleyi (Ball & Roughley, 1982)
 Allotriopus taeniola (Bates, 1882)
 Allotriopus triunfo (Ball & Roughley, 1982)
 Allotriopus whiteheadi (Ball & Roughley, 1982)

References

Pterostichinae